Winnipeg Alliance FC were a professional indoor soccer team that played in the Canadian Major Indoor Soccer League (CMISL) from 2007 through 2011. The team suspended operations in January 2012.

History

2007 season
The Winnipeg Alliance was one of 4 founding teams of the CMISL. In 2007 the league played a Showcase season consisting of exhibition games the Alliance played 2 double headers against the Edmonton Drillers. Although it did not win any games in its showcase season, it did bring a crowd of 7,727 to the MTS Centre.

2008 and 2009 seasons
In the league's inaugural season the Alliance were a road-only team due to scheduling conflicts with the MTS Centre. The team finished in last place and went inactive for the 2009 season.

2010 season
The team changed ownership and played four of its six home games at Gateway Recreational Centre and a doubleheader at the MTS Centre on February 27. The CMISL became affiliated with the Professional Arena Soccer League (PASL-Pro) of the United States and the Alliance played four games against American teams.

Year-by-year

Year-by-year statistics

Home arena
The Alliance played its 2007 exhibition doubleheader at the 15,003 seat MTS Centre with an attendance of 7,727. Due to scheduling concerns the team played a road only team in 2008. After a one-year hiatus the team moved to 7 Oaks Indoor Soccer Complex in 2010 and played a doubleheader at the MTS Centre. For 2011, the team played its home games at the Gateway Recreation Centre.

References

External links
 Official website

Defunct Professional Arena Soccer League teams
Soccer clubs in Winnipeg
Canadian Major Indoor Soccer League teams
2007 establishments in Manitoba
2012 disestablishments in Manitoba
Association football clubs established in 2007
Association football clubs disestablished in 2012